DJ Roslynn aka DJ Rose better known as Roslynn Cobarrubias is a Filipino American TV Host, producer, author, speaker, DJ, radio host, entrepreneur, event producer and marketing executive. She is the co-founder of global talent discovery video platform, that was acquired by Engage:BDR for $7.4M in August 2016. She is also the founder of Little B-Girl Clothing line and boutique marketing agency, the Third Floor Network. Roslynn is currently the host and co-producer of "mydiveo LIVE" and cable network, MyxTV. Premiering on January 11, 2016, the music magazine television show, "mydiveo LIVE" on Myx TV, airs in 15 million households via Time Warner, DirecTV, Cox, Comcast, Sony Roku, MyxTV.com and more cable systems. The TV show highlights emerging, buzzworthy music artists and industry tastemaker interviews, new music videos and music event coverage of artists like , Russ, BJ The Chicago Kid & Leroy Sanchez. Roslynn was featured in the LA Times and on LATV 18's daily program, 'Kababyan Today' with host Giselle Tongi detailing her career history and personal journey. alongside TFC's 'Balitang America' with Cher Calvin.

Roslynn has been a host at several globally live-streamed events including the Grammy/CBS 2010 red carpet live stream. In 2009, Roslynn was the co-host of the Alice in Wonderland "Almost Alice" concert broadcast. Most recently, she was featured in Billboard Magazine after co-producing a concert for Adweek 2011.

In 2009 she was named one of Billboard Magazine's "Top 30 Music Industry Professionals Under 30" with Spotify Founder Daniel Ek & Justin Bieber manager Scooter Braun. In 2007, Roslynn was featured in The Source Magazine "Power 30" with the MySpace.com Co-Founders, Chris DeWolfe & Tom Anderson alongside Diddy and Russell Simmons. In 2009, she was featured on the cover of the Filipino newspaper, the Asian Journal.

References

Living people
Women DJs
American radio DJs
American actresses
American women radio presenters
Year of birth missing (living people)
21st-century American women